Ilonka Náday (4 August 1874 – 20 October 1949) was a Hungarian singer and actress who found her initial success in Austria before returning to sing in Budapest.

Life 
Náday was born in Budapest in 1874.

Náday debuted in 1897 at the People's Theater , in the operetta of József Márkus's operetta, " Kuktakiswoman ".  In October 1899, she joined troupe of the An der Wien Theater in Vienna for three years. She had German voice coaches. By 1900, her success in Vienna was being reported noting that she had appeared over 100 times in that year. She was compared with her mother who had also found success there years before in Austria.

She stopped appearing at the theatre after she married dr. Manó
Jeszenszky Iván Jeszenszky, but she returned to sing solos after her two children were born in 1902 and 1905. In 1917 she joined National Theatre in Budapest where in 1921 she played the role of Gizi Bajor in Sándor Balázs's The Masks. Her husband had died during the war and she had remarried his younger brother but she divorced him in 1919. She retired in 1935 and died of cancer in 1949.

References 

1874 births
1949 deaths
Musicians from Budapest
19th-century Hungarian actresses
20th-century Hungarian actresses
Actresses from Budapest
Austro-Hungarian singers